Lucas Vázquez Iglesias (born 1 July 1991) is a Spanish professional footballer who plays as a right winger or right-back for La Liga club Real Madrid.

Starting his career at Real Madrid, he made his first-team debut in 2015 after a season on loan at Espanyol. He made his La Liga debut with the latter. Since returning to Real Madrid in 2015 he has appeared in more than 200 matches for the club and has won 15 major trophies including four Champions Leagues and three La Liga titles.

Vázquez represented Spain at Euro 2016 and the 2018 World Cup.

Club career

Real Madrid
Born in Curtis, Galicia, Vázquez arrived at Real Madrid's youth system in 2007, aged 16. He made his senior debuts in the 2010–11 season with the C-team and, the following campaign, scored four goals in 23 games to help the reserves return to the second division after a five-year absence; his first came on 25 February 2012 in a 2–2 home draw against La Roda CF.

Vázquez made his first appearance in the second level on 17 August 2012, playing six minutes in a 1–2 away loss against Villarreal CF. He scored his first professional goal on 15 October, netting the winner in a 3–2 home success over UD Las Palmas.

Espanyol
On 19 August 2014, Vázquez was loaned to La Liga's RCD Espanyol, in a season-long deal. He made his debut in the competition on 30 August, coming on as a second-half substitute for Salva Sevilla in a 1–2 home loss against Sevilla FC.

Vázquez scored his first goal in the Spanish top flight on 5 October 2014, netting the first in a 2–0 home success over Real Sociedad. On 3 June of the following year, he signed a four-year permanent deal with the Pericos, for a €2 million fee.

Return to Real Madrid
On 30 June 2015, Real Madrid exercised their buyback clause and Vázquez returned to the club. He made his debut on 12 September in a 6–0 away win over his former team Espanyol, and his first start came a week later, in a 1–0 home defeat of Granada CF.

Vázquez scored his first competitive goal on 30 December 2015, replacing Karim Benzema for the final 15 minutes of the league fixture against Real Sociedad and netting in a 3–1 success at the Santiago Bernabéu Stadium. He contributed with seven appearances in the season's UEFA Champions League, as the tournament ended in a win; in the final against Atlético Madrid, he again came on for the Frenchman late into the second half of a 1–1 draw, and converted his attempt in the penalty shootout triumph.

Vázquez started the 2016 UEFA Super Cup against fellow Spaniards Sevilla FC, providing an assist to Sergio Ramos in injury time to take the game to extra time, where Real Madrid eventually won 3–2. He signed a new contract on 26 October 2016, running until 2021.

Vázquez appeared 33 times during 2016–17 and scored twice, helping Real Madrid to its first league in five years. He added ten matches in the campaign's Champions League, scoring once in the group stage as his team also conquered the latter tournament.

Vázquez made ten appearances during the 2017–18 Champions League and added one goal, when Madrid won their third consecutive and 13th overall title in the competition.

In November 2019 he broke his toe after dropping a weight on it. After returning, he made 18 appearances during the league season, as Real Madrid won the 2019–20 La Liga.

Being a regular started during the 2020–21 season, he injured himself on 10 April 2021, in a 2–1 El Clásico win over FC Barcelona and was ruled out for the remainder of the season with a Posterior cruciate ligament injury in his left knee. On 3 June 2021, he signed a new three-year contract, which keeps him until 2024 at Madrid.

International career
Vázquez did not represent Spain at any youth level. On 17 May 2016 he, Saúl Ñíguez and Sergio Rico were the three uncapped players named in Vicente del Bosque's provisional squad for UEFA Euro 2016 in France, and he also made it to the final list of 23. He made his debut on 7 June, starting and playing 61 minutes in a 0–1 friendly loss to Georgia at the Coliseum Alfonso Pérez. He appeared once in the tournament, replacing Álvaro Morata in the 70th minute of a 0–2 round-of-16 defeat against Italy at the Stade de France. He was then included in the final squad for the 2018 FIFA World Cup, making his debut in the competition on 15 June when he replaced David Silva for the final four minutes of the 3–3 group stage draw to Portugal.

Career statistics

Club

International

Honours
Real Madrid Castilla
Segunda División B: 2011–12

Real Madrid
La Liga: 2016–17, 2019–20, 2021–22
Supercopa de España: 2017, 2021–22
UEFA Champions League: 2015–16, 2016–17, 2017–18, 2021–22
UEFA Super Cup: 2016, 2017, 2022
FIFA Club World Cup: 2016, 2017, 2018

Notes

References

External links
Real Madrid official profile

1991 births
Living people
People from Betanzos (comarca)
Sportspeople from the Province of A Coruña
Spanish footballers
Footballers from Galicia (Spain)
Association football wingers
La Liga players
Segunda División players
Segunda División B players
Tercera División players
Real Madrid C footballers
Real Madrid Castilla footballers
RCD Espanyol footballers
Real Madrid CF players
Spain international footballers
UEFA Euro 2016 players
2018 FIFA World Cup players
UEFA Champions League winning players